The Wilmington and Western Railroad  is a freight and heritage railroad in northern Delaware, operating over a former Baltimore and Ohio Railroad (B&O) branch line between Wilmington and Hockessin. The  railroad operates both steam and diesel locomotives. It was added to the National Register of Historic Places as a national historic district in 1980. Wilmington & Western serves one customer for revenue service, and interchanges with CSX Transportation at Landenberg Junction, Delaware

Wilmington & Western's two General Motors Diesel-Electric SW1 locomotives are the oldest in routine scheduled service.

History
The Delaware and Chester County Railroad was incorporated in February 1867 to build from Wilmington in the direction of Parkesburg or Atglen, Pennsylvania, and was renamed the Wilmington and Western Railroad in March 1869, opening the line to Landenberg in 1872. A foreclosure sale in April 1877 produced the Delaware Western Railroad, which was incorporated in June 1877 and merged into the Baltimore and Philadelphia Railroad, a B&O subsidiary, in February 1883.

The B&O cut back the line to Southwood in the early 1940s and to Hockessin in the late 1950s. Historic Red Clay Valley, Inc. began operating steam tourist trains on weekends in 1966, reusing the old W&W name, and in August 1982 the W&W bought the branch from the Chessie System for $25,000, which included Ex-B&O SW1 #8408 as a part of the purchase. Under the Historic Red Clay Valley Inc. the operations are managed by a Board of Directors, paid staff and a large number of volunteers.

In 1999, the rains of Hurricane Floyd caused considerable damage to the railroad. Two trestles were entirely destroyed by the flooding of Red Clay Creek, which also caused track washouts and damaged several other trestles. The two destroyed bridges were replaced by steel trestles, but the other timber trestles were simply repaired.

In 2003, Tropical Storm Henri struck the valley and produced an even more catastrophic flood. While the two steel bridges (and an iron trestle at Ashland) survived the flood, the remaining bridges were swept away or irreparably damaged. Despite the damage caused by these storms, the Wilmington and Western continued to operate on the remaining track, and replaced all of the destroyed bridges with steel trestles. The line officially reopened into Hockessin on June 30, 2007.

The railroad celebrated its 50th anniversary operating as a tourist railroad in 2016.

Excursions
Several different excursions are offered by the Wilmington and Western Railroad, running through the Red Clay Creek valley. Trains operate out of the Greenbank station near the southern end of the railroad. The railroad offers two regular excursions which run on weekends during the operating season. The Hockessin Flyer runs round-trip from Greenbank to the northern end of the line in Hockessin for a 2.5-hour trip with a 30-minute layover in Hockessin. The Mt. Cuba Meteor runs round-trip from Greenbank to the Mount Cuba Picnic Grove for a 1.5-hour trip with a 30-minute layover for a picnic at the Mount Cuba Picnic Grove.

The Wilmington and Western Railroad also offers several special themed excursions. Some of the themed excursions include the Easter Bunny Express, the Fireworks Express on Independence Day, a dinner train called the Royal Blue Dinner Train, the Brews on Board train serving craft brews, the Civil War Skirmish Weekend, the Princess Express, the Superhero Express, the Autumn Leaf Special offering views of fall foliage, the Halloween Express, the Holiday Lights Express offering views of Christmas lights, and the Santa Claus Express around Christmas. Groups may also charter a caboose, car, or entire train for an event. A caboose attached to the end of a regularly scheduled train may be rented for birthday parties.

Equipment

Locomotives

Former units

Passenger cars
Four DL&W Boonton passenger cars operate along the railroad. Combine #410, Coach #571, Coach #581, and Coach #603 were built in 1914-15 by the Pullman Company for the Delaware, Lackawanna and Western Railroad for commuter service as part of an order for 77 cars. The cars were in commuter service until the late 1950s, when newer passenger cars were pressed into service. The four Boonton passenger cars were purchased by HRCV in the early 1960s for passenger service. The passenger cars have been in service since May 1966.
Open-Air Coach #442 Kiamensi Springs was originally a locomotive-hauled PRR MP54 passenger car built by the Pennsylvania Railroad's Altoona Works in 1912. The car was converted to a MP54E6 EMU between 1950 and 1951 by adding electric traction motors. This coach car was used in commuter service for the Pennsylvania Railroad until being retired by 1978. Coach #442 arrived at the Wilmington and Western Railroad in 1988 and was converted into an open-air car in the late 1990s, entering service on May 23, 1999.
Parlor Car #6795 was built in 1930 by the Pullman Company for the Delaware, Lackawanna and Western Railroad as an EMU commuter coach numbered #2548. When the Delaware, Lackawannana & Western Railroad merged with the Erie Railroad to become the Erie Lackawanna Railway in 1960, #2548 was renumbered to #3548. The car was eventually purchased by Philadelphia radio personality Tom Moran, who placed it into storage in Woodstown, New Jersey. Moran painted the car into a Pennsylvania-Reading Seashore Lines scheme and renumbered it to #6795. The Wilmington and Western Railroad purchased #6795 on January 14, 1991 and kept the car in storage until early 2006, when it was restored and converted into a parlor car.

Cabooses
Caboose #C149 was built by the Erie Railroad at its Dunmore Shops in July 1941. The caboose saw service on the Erie Railroad and later the Erie Lackawanna Railway. In 1976, the Erie Lackawanna Railway became part of Conrail and #C149 was renumbered to #46195. The caboose eventually came to the Wilmington and Western Railroad as #C149 and was used on work trains. The caboose was refurbished in 2000 to be used for passengers and for birthday parties, entering revenue service on April 13, 2001. In 2016, the caboose was taken out of service for a major interior restoration.
Caboose #C2013 was built by the B&O at its Washington, Indiana shops in 1926 as a class I-5 caboose. It became a class I-5D when steel frame trucks were added. After coming to the Wilmington and Western Railroad, the caboose was restored to its original window placement and a back-up horn and lights were added. In summer 2005, the caboose had new roller-bearing trucks added and the wood siding replaced. In 2006, #C2013 underwent a restoration that reconstructed the interior and repainted the caboose into an authentic B&O scheme.
Caboose #C2042 was built by the B&O at its Washington, Indiana shops in August 1926 as a class I-5 caboose. It became a class I-5D when cast frame trucks were added. After coming to the Wilmington and Western Railroad, a back-up horn and lights were added. The caboose underwent an exterior restoration in 2013 that gave it a fresh coat of point, and underwent an interior restoration in 2016.

See also

 List of heritage railways
 List of Delaware railroads

References

External links

Wilmington & Western Railroad
Wilmington & Western Railroad Photos

Railway lines on the National Register of Historic Places
Heritage railroads in Delaware
Delaware railroads
Switching and terminal railroads
Spin-offs of the Baltimore and Ohio Railroad
Railway companies established in 1982
Defunct Delaware railroads
Defunct Pennsylvania railroads
Predecessors of the Baltimore and Ohio Railroad
Railway companies established in 1869
Railway companies disestablished in 1877
Transportation in New Castle County, Delaware
Tourist attractions in New Castle County, Delaware
1869 establishments in Delaware
Historic districts on the National Register of Historic Places in Delaware
National Register of Historic Places in Wilmington, Delaware
Rail infrastructure on the National Register of Historic Places in Delaware